Charlie W. Johnson Stadium is a stadium in Columbia, South Carolina.  It is primarily used for American football, and is the home field of the Benedict College. The stadium has also been host of the South Carolina High School League's Class 1A football state championship games since 2010 and was also the host of the Class 2A games from 2011 to 2013. The stadium holds 11,000 people; it opened in 2006. It underwent renovations in the summer of 2019, with new field turn, new scoreboard (25 feet by 43 feet), landscaping, new roofs on field house and press box, upgraded President's Suite level.

References

External links
Official site

College football venues
Benedict Tigers football
American football venues in South Carolina
Sports venues in Richland County, South Carolina
Buildings and structures in Columbia, South Carolina
Sports in Columbia, South Carolina
2006 establishments in South Carolina
Sports venues completed in 2006